Piyachat Srimarueang (born January 11, 1989), is a Thai retired professional footballer who played as an attacking midfielder.

References

info.thscore.cc

Piyachat Srimarueang
Association football midfielders
Piyachat Srimarueang
Piyachat Srimarueang
Piyachat Srimarueang
1989 births
Living people
Piyachat Srimarueang